What You Gonna Do When the Grid Goes Down? is the fifteenth studio album by American political hip hop group Public Enemy. It was released on September 25, 2020, on Def Jam Recordings, making it the group's first album for the label since 1998's He Got Game. Production was handled by C-Doc, The LBX, DJ Infinite, DJ Pain 1, DJ Premier, Easy Mo Bee, Flavor Flav, Johnny "Juice" Rasado, Racer X and Threepeeoh. It features guest appearances from George Clinton, Jahi, Ad-Rock, Black Thought, Cypress Hill, Daddy-O, Ice-T, James Bomb, Mark Jenkins, Mike D, Ms. Ariel, Nas, PMD, Pop Diesel, Questlove, Rapsody, Run-DMC, The Impossebulls and YG. It was supported by two singles: "State of the Union (STFU)" and "Fight the Power: Remix 2020".

Critical reception 

What You Gonna Do When the Grid Goes Down? was met with generally positive reviews. At Metacritic, which assigns a normalized rating out of 100 to reviews from professional publications, the album received an average score of 76, based on 12 reviews. The aggregator AnyDecentMusic? has the critical consensus of the album at a 7.6 out of 10, based on 13 reviews.

Reviewing in his Substack-published "Consumer Guide" column, Robert Christgau acknowledged Public Enemy's continued noisy aesthetic and felt engaged by Chuck D's thoughts on "the dependence of everybody's world economy on an information system susceptible to attack from actors who could prove as dangerous as Donald Trump himself". He highlighted in particular the song "State of the Union (STFU)" and "a host of committed cameos" elsewhere.

Track listing

Charts

References

External links

2020 albums
Def Jam Recordings albums
Public Enemy (band) albums
Albums produced by DJ Premier
Albums produced by Easy Mo Bee